Neoregelia schubertii is a flowering plant in the genus Neoregelia. The species is native to Brazil. , the Encyclopaedia of Bromeliads regarded it as a synonym of Neoregelia compacta.

References

schubertii
Flora of Brazil